Any Day Now is the ninth studio album by Joan Baez, released as double LP in 1968 and made up exclusively of Bob Dylan songs. It peaked at number 30 on the Billboard Pop Albums chart.

History
At the time of the album's original release, six of the songs had not been included on official Dylan releases. One song, "Love is Just a Four-Letter Word," has apparently never been recorded by Dylan himself. The album was produced during a marathon recording session in Nashville in September 1968, the fruits of which resulted in two albums:  Any Day Now, and 1969's David's Album.  Baez would return to Nashville to record a number of times during the next several years.

Laying Bob Dylan sheet music on the floor in front of her, Baez closed her eyes and picked at random, the results of which made up the track listing.

Joan Baez did illustrations for each of the songs, included in the gatefold of the album.

The record went gold in 1969.

The Vanguard reissue contains two bonus tracks: "Blowin' In The Wind" and "It Ain't Me Babe," both live performances from Baez' 1967 tour of Japan.

Reception 

In his Allmusic review, music critic Thom Jurek wrote of the album "Her empathy for the material, her keen understanding of Dylan's sound world, and her own glorious voice brought another dimension to these 16 songs and, if anything, extended their meanings. There is no greater interpreter of Dylan's music, and while evidence of that certainly was offered on earlier recordings (such as 1967's Joan), the verdict was solidified here... The bottom line is that Any Day Now, like Joan and David's Album, found Baez at an intensely inspirational and creative peak."

Track listing
All songs written by Bob Dylan, except as noted.

Side 1 

"Love Minus Zero/No Limit"
"North Country Blues"
"You Ain't Goin' Nowhere"
"Drifter's Escape"
"I Pity the Poor Immigrant"

Side 2 

"Tears of Rage" (Bob Dylan, Richard Manuel)
"Sad Eyed Lady of the Lowlands"

Side 3 

"Love Is Just a Four-Letter Word"
"I Dreamed I Saw St. Augustine"
"Walls of Red Wing"
"Dear Landlord"
"One Too Many Mornings"

Side 4 

"I Shall Be Released"
"Boots of Spanish Leather"
"Walkin' Down the Line"
"Restless Farewell"

Personnel
Joan Baez – vocals, guitar
Fred Carter Jr. – mandolin
Pete Drake – pedal steel guitar
Johnny Gimble – fiddle
Roy Huskey, Jr. – bass
Tommy Jackson – fiddle
Jerry Kennedy – guitar
Jerry Reed – guitar
Harold Bradley – guitar, dobro
Hargus "Pig" Robbins – piano
Stephen Stills – guitar
Harold Rugg – guitar, dobro
Grady Martin – guitar
Buddy Spicher – fiddle
Norbert Putnam – bass
Kenny Buttrey – drums

Chart positions

Certifications

References

1968 albums
Joan Baez albums
Bob Dylan tribute albums
Albums produced by Maynard Solomon
Vanguard Records albums